Cho Jae-jin (born 9 July 1981) is a former South Korean football player.

Playing career
Cho emerged as a national star when he played for South Korean under-23 team in the 2004 Summer Olympics. He scored two goals in a 3–3 draw with Mali, helping his team advance to the quarter-finals.

Cho showed impressive performances including 45 goals in 101 J1 League appearances while playing for Shimizu S-Pulse from 2004 to 2007. He was also selected for South Korean national team for the 2006 FIFA World Cup, and played three World Cup matches as a powerful target man. David Pleat, an expert of The Guardian at the time, selected him as one of six talents outside the Premier League after the World Cup.

After his successful stint at Shimizu, Cho tried to join a Premier League club, and received offers from Newcastle United, Fulham, Portsmouth and West Ham United. However, he signed for K League club Jeonbuk Hyundai Motors after failing to negotiate with them.

Cho has congenital hip dysplasia, and started to suffer from pain when he was 22. He had relied on the drug to continue playing football, but eventually announced his retirement on 18 March 2011.

Personal life
Cho is a close friend of Kim Dong-jin, who was also a member of South Korean Olympic team.

Cho appeared in advertisements for Adidas, Cosmopolitan and clothing brand "ASK" in South Korea.

Career statistics

Club

International

Results list South Korea's goal tally first.

Filmography

Television

Honours

Player 
Suwon Samsung Bluewings
Korean League Cup: 2000, 2001
Korean Super Cup: 2000
Asian Club Championship: 2000–01
Asian Super Cup: 2001

Gwangju Sangmu Bulsajo
Korean Semi-professional League (Spring): 2002
Korean Semi-professional Championship runner-up: 2002

Shimizu S-Pulse
Emperor's Cup runner-up: 2005

Gamba Osaka
Emperor's Cup: 2009

South Korea
AFC Asian Cup third place: 2007

Entertainer

References

External links
 
 Cho Jae-jin – National Team Stats at KFA 
 

1981 births
Living people
Association football forwards
South Korean footballers
South Korean expatriate footballers
South Korea international footballers
Suwon Samsung Bluewings players
Gimcheon Sangmu FC players
Shimizu S-Pulse players
Jeonbuk Hyundai Motors players
Gamba Osaka players
K League 1 players
J1 League players
Expatriate footballers in Japan
2006 FIFA World Cup players
2007 AFC Asian Cup players
Footballers at the 2004 Summer Olympics
Olympic footballers of South Korea
People from Paju
South Korean expatriate sportspeople in Japan
Sportspeople from Gyeonggi Province